A Hispanic-serving institution (HSI) is defined in federal law as an accredited, degree-granting, public or private nonprofit institution of higher education with 25% or more total undergraduate Hispanic or Latino full-time equivalent (FTE) student enrollment. In the 2018–19 academic year, 539 institutions met the federal enrollment criterion.

Background
According to Title III of the Higher Education Act of 1965, in order for an HSI to receive federal funding it must satisfy the following criteria:

 Have a least 25 percent Hispanic or Latino undergraduate full-time equivalent student enrollment.
Must be an eligible public or private non-profit institution of higher education
 Must offer at least two-year academic programs that lead to a degree
 Must be accredited by an agency or association recognized by the Department of Education
 Must have high enrollment of students in need

The Department of Education offers grants to institutions defined as HSIs which can be used for many academic purposes serving all ethnicities at the institution including faculty development, funds and administrative management, development and improvement of academic programs, endowment funds, curriculum development, scientific or laboratory equipment for teaching, renovation of instructional facilities, joint use of facilities, academic tutoring, counseling programs and student support services.

Any HSI can benefit from the assistance to increase the amount of Hispanic or Latino students in higher education, and most importantly, the amount of Hispanic or Latino students graduating from a higher education institution. To be considered an HSI, universities have to meet certain criteria: 2-and 4-year colleges and universities had to have at least a 25% Hispanic or Latino enrollment total. This percentage was the minimum required by the Higher Education Act in 1992 (Laden, 2001). Because HSIs goals are to serve primarily Hispanic populations (Shehadeh & Termos, 2014), they are found in metropolitan areas with increasing Hispanic and Latino populations. Some of these areas include Los Angeles, San Antonio, Chicago, Philadelphia, Detroit, and Miami (Laden, 2001). Vigil discusses the increasing rates of Latinos in these areas due to the demand of unskilled temporary labor and for seemingly attainable housing opportunities. Although HSI's help Latino students in higher education, "HSI's do not have a declared, specific mission to serve Hispanics" (Laden, 2001).

Title V of the Act, introduced in 1998, is another funding stream specifically for HSIs to assist them in improving their higher educational provision.

Hispanic Association of Colleges and Universities
In 1992, the Hispanic Association of Colleges and Universities led the effort to convince Congress to formally recognize campuses with high Hispanic enrollment as federally designated HSIs and to begin targeting federal appropriations to those campuses. Today, HACU represents nearly 470 colleges and universities committed to Hispanic higher education success in the U.S., Puerto Rico, Latin America, Spain and Portugal.  Although HACU member institutions in the U.S. represent less than 13% of all higher education institutions nationwide, together they enroll more than two-thirds of all Hispanic college students.  HACU is the only national educational association that represents Hispanic-Serving Institutions (HSIs).

Funding 
HSI federal funding grew in the early years (1998-2004) of Title V (the original and still linchpin HSI federal funding program), then leveled off from 2004-07 as the number of HSIs and Hispanic college students continued to grow. It increased dramatically in 2008 with the addition of the HSI STEM program, but since the Recession of 2009–10, it has actually declined while HSIs and Hispanic enrollments have increased even more rapidly.

One of the main challenges HSIs face as they address their critical role is persistent underfunding relative to other degree-granting institutions. According to 2016-17 IPEDS data, HSIs on average received $3,117 per student on average from all federal revenue sources, compared to $4,605 per student for all degree-granting institutions, just two-thirds the funding to educate a disproportionately low-income student population. The result is that HSIs only receive on average 68 cents for every federal dollar going to all other colleges and universities annually.

List of institutions
Below are institutions of higher education designated as Hispanic-Serving Institutions in the United States based on 2018–19 data from the Integrated Postsecondary Education Data System (IPEDS).  For a complete list of institutions that meet the 25% federal enrollment criterion in the 2018–19 academic year, click here.

Notes

See also
Historically Black Colleges and Universities
Colegio Cesar Chavez
Higher Education Act of 1965

References

External links
U.S. Department of Education Act, Title V, HSIs
Hispanic Association of Colleges and Universities
HACU list of HSIs

Higher education in the United States
Education policy in the United States
Race and education in the United States
Hispanic and Latino American